Edmund Bryant "Nutty" Hazle  (26 November 1918 – 22 June 2006) was a British soldier during the Second World War and was one of only five men awarded the Distinguished Conduct Medal (DCM) and bar during the conflict.

Early life
Hazle was born in Hadleigh, Essex shortly after the end of the First World War and after leaving school gained employment in the printing trade.  Prior to the outbreak of the Second World War Hazle joined the Territorial Army and was a member of the 4th Battalion, the Essex Regiment where he served in the battalion band.

Second World War
In September 1939 at the outbreak of war, the Territorial Army units were all mobilized and the 1/4th battalion formed part of 161st Infantry Brigade.

The battalion served in West Africa, North Africa and Cyprus before being transferred to 5th Indian Infantry Brigade within 4th Indian Infantry Division and by Summer 1942 the battalion was involved in the North African Campaign.  Hazle's role within the battalion was as one of the stretcher bearers and it was in this role that he won his first award of the DCM.  During the First Battle of El Alamein Hazle went, on many occasions, either into forward positions or into no-mans land to treat and recover wounded men.  On 23 July on four occasions he treated and recovered wounded men from a position overlooked by enemy snipers; on the fourth occasion, Hazle was shot and severely wounded.  Hazle's Commanding Officer, Lt Col Arthur Noble, submitted a recommendation for an immediate award of the DCM which was approved by Lt-Gen Montgomery (General officer commanding, 8th Army) and General Alexander (Commander-in-Chief Middle East Forces) in August 1942; notice of the award was published in the London Gazette on 24 September 1942.  The citation read: 

Hazle's injuries kept him out of front line service for 18 months but had rejoined the battalion by March 1944, by this time serving in Italy.  The battalion was heavily engaged in the Second Battle of Monte Cassino around an area known as Hangman's Hill.  Hazle, by now appointed a Lance corporal was one of a two company party sent to support 1/9th Gurkha Rifles.  The attack by the Gurkhas and the Essex battalion faltered and for six days Hazle and another Essex stretcher bearer, Lance corporal Leonard Piper formed the only medical support available to the isolated men.  With scant resources Hazle treated wounds and even performed an amputation before the troops were evacuated.  The commanding officer of the Gurkhas, Lt Col G Nangle wrote a recommendation for a bar to the DCM for Hazle in April 1944 which was approved by Lt-Gen Freybeg (General officer commanding New Zealand Corps) and, again, Lt-Gen Alexander (Commander-in-Chief Allied Central Mediterranean Force) in June 1944.  The award was published in the London Gazette on 3 August 1944.  Lt Col Nangle wrote in the citation: 

After Cassino Hazle continued to serve through the Italian Campaign until the 4th Indian Infantry Division was moved to Greece in December 1944 where he took part in the Dekemvriana operations.  After Greece Hazle returned to the UK where he was demobilised in 1945 and returned to the print industry.

Death
Hazle died in 2006 and was survived by his wife, Cissie, whom he had married after leaving the army, and their three children.

References

Footnotes

Notes

Sources
 
 
 

1918 births
2006 deaths
Military personnel from Essex
Essex Regiment soldiers
Recipients of the Distinguished Conduct Medal
People from Hadleigh, Essex
British Army personnel of World War II